Vineland Senior High School South is a public high school located in Vineland, New Jersey, as part of the Vineland Public Schools. The school opened in 1963.  It holds classes for 11th and 12th grade students, as well as a small number of students from other grades.  It was considered to be a different school but on the same campus of Vineland Senior High School North, but as of 2010-11 operates on a consolidated basis as Vineland High School.

As of the 2008-09 school year, the school had an enrollment of 2,830 students and 198.5 classroom teachers (on an FTE basis), for a student–teacher ratio of 14.3.

The school was the 222nd-ranked public high school in New Jersey out of 316 schools statewide, in New Jersey Monthly magazine's September 2008 cover story on the state's Top Public High Schools. The school was ranked 194th in the magazine's September 2006 issue, which surveyed 316 schools across the state.

A proposed dress code, slated to take effect for the 2006-07 school year, had given way to controversy and debate among students and parents.

Demographics
White - 35%
Hispanic - 43%
African American - 20%
Asian - 2%
American Indian - <1%

Source:

Curriculum

Due to its large student body Vineland High is able to offer a wide range of elective classes topics include arts and design, computers, media, automobile repair, wood working, as well as a wide range of Advanced Placement courses.  Courses such as English, mathematics, history, and science are tracked into general, college preparatory, and honors.  Students are tracked into honors mathematics and science from middle school.

Requirements for Graduation

Requirements:
 4 Years of English
 3 Years of Math
 3 Years of History
 3 Years of Science
 4 Years of P.E./Health
 1 Year of a World Language
 1 Year of an Art
 1 Year of CTE Career and Technical class
 40 Hours of Community Service

Athletics
The Vineland High School Fighting Clan compete in the Atlantic Division of the Cape-Atlantic League, an athletic conference consisting of both parochial and public high schools located in Atlantic County, Cape May County, Cumberland County, and Gloucester County, New Jersey. The Cape-Atlantic League operates under the aegis of the New Jersey State Interscholastic Athletic Association.

Vineland Senior High School South/Vineland Senior High School North have participated since 1893 in Annual Thanksgiving Football Game with Millville Senior High School, in Millville. The rivalry is the one of the oldest Public High School rivalry in the United States, meeting for the 135th time in 2006. Vineland leads the series, 61-55, with 19 games ending in ties.

They also have a longstanding boys swim team rivalry between Vineland and Mainland Regional High School that has lasted many years.

Standard of Dress
Students from preschool to 12th grade are required to wear a uniform consisting of red, white, or black collared shirts and tan or black pants, shorts, or skirts. The regulation mandating school uniforms can be accessed at http://www.vineland.org/files/_qYAWW_/3b1b0cf308278a493745a49013852ec4/uniform_regs618.pdf

Administration
Core members of the school's administration are:
Mrs. Suzette DeMarchi  - Executive Principal
Mrs Kimberly Rivera - Assistant Principal
Richard Panas - Assistant Principal
Jacqueline Roman-Alvarez Assistant Principal

References

External links 
VHS South Website
Vineland Public Schools

Data for the Vineland Public Schools, National Center for Education Statistics
South Jersey Sports: Vineland HS

Educational institutions established in 1963
Public high schools in Cumberland County, New Jersey
Vineland, New Jersey
1963 establishments in New Jersey